The 9th César Awards ceremony, presented by the Académie des Arts et Techniques du Cinéma, honoured the best French films of 1983 and took place on 3 March 1984 at the Théâtre de l'Empire in Paris. The ceremony was chaired by Gene Kelly and hosted by Léon Zitrone. Le Bal and À nos amours tied for the award for Best Film.

Winners and nominees
The winners are highlighted in bold:

Best Film:Le Bal, directed by Ettore ScolaÀ nos amours, directed by Maurice PialatCoup de foudre, directed by Diane KurysTchao pantin, directed by Claude BerriL'Été meurtrier, directed by Jean Becker
Best Foreign Film:Fanny and Alexander, directed by Ingmar BergmanCarmen, directed by Carlos SauraThe Gods Must Be Crazy, directed by Jamie UysTootsie, directed by Sydney Pollack 
Best First Work:Rue cases nègres, directed by Euzhan PalcyLe Dernier Combat, directed by Luc BessonLe Destin de Juliette, directed by Aline IssermannLa Trace, directed by Bernard Favre
Best Actor:Coluche, for Tchao pantinGérard Depardieu, for Les CompèresYves Montand, for Garçon! Michel Serrault, for Mortelle randonnéeAlain Souchon, for L'Été meurtrier
Best Actress:Isabelle Adjani, for L'Été meurtrierMiou-Miou, for Coup de foudreNathalie Baye, for J'ai épousé une ombreNicole Garcia, for Les Mots pour le direFanny Ardant, for Vivement dimanche!
Best Supporting Actor:Richard Anconina, for Tchao pantinGuy Marchand, for Coup de foudreBernard Fresson, for Garçon! Jacques Villeret, for Garçon!François Cluzet, for L'Été meurtrier  
Best Supporting Actress:Suzanne Flon, for L'Été meurtrierVictoria Abril, for La Lune dans le caniveauStéphane Audran, for Mortelle randonnéeAgnès Soral, for Tchao pantinSabine Azéma, for La vie est un roman
Most Promising Actor:  Richard Anconina, for Tchao pantinJacques Penot, for Au nom de tous les miensJean-Hugues Anglade, for L'Homme blessé François Cluzet, for Vive la sociale!
Most Promising Actress: Sandrine Bonnaire, for À nos amoursLaure Duthilleul, for Le Destin de JulietteAgnès Soral, for Tchao pantinÉlisabeth Bourgine, for Vive la sociale!
Best Director:Ettore Scola, for La BalClaude Berri, for Tchao pantinFrançois Truffaut, for Vivement dimanche!Maurice Pialat, for À nos amoursJean Becker, for L'Été meurtrier
Best Writing - Original: Hervé Guibert, Patrice Chéreau, for L'Homme blesséFrancis Veber, for Les CompèresDiane Kurys, Alain Le Henry, for Coup de foudre
Best Writing - Adaptation: Sébastien Japrisot, for L'Été meurtrierRobert Enrico, for Au nom de tous les miensClaude Berri, for Tchao pantin  
Best Cinematography: Bruno Nuytten, for Tchao pantinRicardo Aronovich, for Le BalPhilippe Rousselot, for La Lune dans le caniveauPierre Lhomme, for Mortelle randonnée  
Best Sound:Jean Labussière, Gérard Lamps, for Tchao pantinJean-Louis Ughetto, Luc Yersin, for L'ArgentJacques Maumont, Pierre Lenoir, for Garçon!Nadine Muse, Paul Lainé, Maurice Gilbert, for Mortelle randonnée
Best Editing:Jacques Witta, for L'Été meurtrierFrançoise Prenant, for Faits diversFrançoise Bonnot, for Hanna K.Denise de Casabianca, for L'Homme blesséClaire Pinheiro, for Les Mots pour le dire
Best Music: Vladimir Cosma, for Le BalCharlélie Couture, for Tchao pantinSerge Gainsbourg, for ÉquateurGeorges Delerue, for L'Été meurtrier  
Best Production Design: Hilton McConnico, for La Lune dans le caniveauJean-Pierre Kohut-Svelko, for Mortelle randonnéeAlexandre Trauner, for Tchao pantinJacques Saulnier, for La vie est un roman
Best Animated Short:Le Voyage d'Orphée, directed by Jean-Manuel CostaAu-delà de minuit, directed by Pierre BerlettaLe Sang, directed by Jacques Rouxel
Best Fiction Short:Star suburb: La banlieue des étoiles, directed by Stéphane DrouotCoup de feu, directed by Magali ClémentPanique au montage, directed by Olivier EsmeinToro Moreno, directed by Gérard Krawczyk
Best Documentary Short:Ulysse, directed by Agnès VardaJe sais que j'ai tort mais demandez à mes copains ils disent la même chose, directed by Pierre LevyLa Vie au bout des doigts, directed by Jean-Paul Janssen 
Best French Language Film:Dans la ville blanche, directed by Alain Tanner
Honorary César:René ClémentGeorges de BeauregardEdwige Feuillère

See also
 56th Academy Awards
 37th British Academy Film Awards

References

External links
 Official website
 
 9th César Awards at AlloCiné

1984
1984 film awards
Cesar